Avtandil Khurtsidze (born 2 May 1979) is a Georgian former professional boxer who competed from 2002 to 2017. He held the WBO interim middleweight title in 2017 and won the IBO middleweight title in 2011. He also challenged for the interim WBA middleweight title in 2010.

In September 2018, Khurtsidze was convicted of racketeering and wire fraud conspiracy and sentenced to ten years' imprisonment, and is expected to remain incarcerated in the United States until 2028.

Professional career

Early career 
Khurtsidze compiled a record of 7-1-2 in his first ten fights, before making Ukraine his new home for his next fifteen fights. While fighting in Ukraine, he won the WBA Inter-Continental middleweight title in July 2008 and defended it four times. On 31 July 2010, Khurtsidze beat Sergey Khomitsky in Minsk, Belarus by sixth-round corner retirement.

Khurtsidze vs. N'Dam N'Jikam 
The victory over Khomitsky marked Khurtsidze's 16th consecutive victory. Khurtsidze was now ranked #2 by the WBA, and his next fight was for the WBA interim middleweight title against Hassan N'Dam N'Jikam (ranked #1 by the WBA) on 30 October 2010 in Paris. During the fight, N’Dam N'Jikam was cut over both eyes, as Khurtsidze, being much smaller, tended to lean forward with his head like a stocky bull and often collided heads with his opponent. Despite Khurtsidze piling on constant pressure and being unfazed by N'Dam N'Jikam's shots, he lost a close unanimous decision with scores of 117-111, 115-114 and 115-114. The decision was controversial, which was reflected by the fans booing the announcement of the decision.

IBO middleweight champion

Khurtsidze vs. Cendrowski 
Khurtsidze rebounded from the controversial loss to N'Dam N'Jikam by returning to his native Georgia for his next fight, the first time he had done so since his professional debut. He faced Mariusz Cendrowski for the vacant IBO middleweight title on 13 March 2011. Khurtsidze applied his trademark aggression to continuously stalk Cendrowski all over the ring, and landed powerful punches with his left hand throughout the duration of the fight. After twelve rounds, Khurtsidze was awarded a unanimous decision victory, with scores of 120-108, 116-112, 117-112, becoming the IBO middleweight champion.

Khurtsidze vs. Miranda 
On 11 June 2011, Khurtsidze defended his IBO middleweight title against Dionisio Miranda in Kyiv, winning by first-round knockout. Khurtsidze knocked his opponent down with a crushing overhand left. Miranda got up but was quickly put on the canvas face down after Khurtsidze caught him with a big left hook.

Later that same year, Khurtsidze's title reign ended when he was stripped of his IBO title, due to the sanctioning body not approving of his choice of Ossie Duran as an opponent. Khurtsidze would go on to beat Duran on 18 December 2011 by majority decision, with scores of 114-114, 114-113 and 115-113, to capture the vacant WBC Silver middleweight title.

Winning streak in 2014-17

Khurtsidze vs. Douglas 
After his win against Ossie Duran, Khurtsidze had a layoff of over two and a half years. He finally returned to the ring in July 2014, where he would go on to win four consecutive bouts in the United States by technical knockout, before facing undefeated middleweight prospect Antoine Douglas as a short notice opponent on 5 March 2016, after Douglas' original opponent Sam Soliman sustained an injury. Despite being the betting underdog, Khurtsidze relentlessly pressed Douglas all night, dropping him in the third and seventh rounds, and eventually forced the referee to stop the action, winning the bout via tenth-round technical knockout.

Khurtsidze vs. Langford 
In early February 2017, Khurtsidze, who was mandatory challenger for WBO middleweight champion Billy Joe Saunders, took a step aside fee to allow Saunders to pursue a bigger fight. On 28 February, it was announced that Khurtsidze would face undefeated Tommy Langford for the vacant interim WBO title on 22 April 2017. Langford was ranked #3 by the WBO at middleweight. Khurtsidze connected with a left hook to win the bout by fifth-round technical knockout, bringing his streak of consecutive TKO victories to six, and securing a world title shot against Saunders.

Canceled Saunders fight 
The day after Khurtsidze's victory against Tommy Langford, the fight between Khurtsidze and WBO middleweight champion Billy Joe Saunders was announced as taking place at the Copper Box Arena in London on 8 July 2017. However, on 8 June, Khurtsidze was arrested in New York along with 32 others, linking him with a Russian and Georgian crime syndicate. Racketeer charges and conspiracy to commit fraud were the two alleged charges; promoter Lou DiBella said that, while the fight would not be completely called off, it would be postponed. Khurtsidze would ultimately never fight Saunders as he was convicted of racketeering and wire fraud conspiracy and sentenced to ten years' imprisonment in September 2018, effectively bringing his boxing career to an abrupt end.

RICO indictment and incarceration 
On 8 June 2017, prosecutors from the US District Court for the Southern District of New York indicted Khurtsidze on charges of violating the Racketeer Influenced and Corrupt Organization (RICO) Act and conspiracy to commit wire fraud in connection with a Russian organised crime syndicate operating in the New York City area. According to the indictment, Khurtsidze is alleged to have paid $17,800 for three cases of purportedly stolen cigarettes.

On 30 August 2018, it was reported that Khurtsidze had been stabbed in the face in a "stabbing rampage" in a Brooklyn detention center, after members of his crime syndicate Razhden Shulaya were involved in a reported row with a Latin American gang.

In September 2018, Khurtsidze was convicted of racketeering and wire fraud conspiracy and sentenced to ten years' imprisonment.

Professional boxing record

|-
|align="center" colspan=8|37 fights, 33 wins (22 knockouts), 2 losses (1 knockout), 2 draws
|-
|align=center style="border-style: none none solid solid; background: #e3e3e3"|Result
|align=center style="border-style: none none solid solid; background: #e3e3e3"|Record
|align=center style="border-style: none none solid solid; background: #e3e3e3"|Opponent
|align=center style="border-style: none none solid solid; background: #e3e3e3"|Type
|align=center style="border-style: none none solid solid; background: #e3e3e3"|Round, time
|align=center style="border-style: none none solid solid; background: #e3e3e3"|Date
|align=center style="border-style: none none solid solid; background: #e3e3e3"|Location
|align=center style="border-style: none none solid solid; background: #e3e3e3"|Notes
|- align=center
|Win
|33-2-2
|align=left| Tommy Langford
|
|
|
|align=left|
|align=left|
|- align=center
|- align=center
|Win
|32-2-2
|align=left| Antoine Douglas
|
|
|
|align=left|
|align=left|
|- align=center
|Win
|31-2-2
|align=left| Melvin Betancourt
|
|
|
|align=left|
|align=left|
|- align=center
|Win
|30-2-2
|align=left| Phillip Penson
|
|
|
|align=left|
|align=left|
|- align=center
|Win
|29-2-2
|align=left| Eddie Hunter
|
|
|
|align=left|
|align=left|
|- align=center
|Win
|28-2-2
|align=left| Allen Conyers
|
|
|
|align=left|
|align=left|
|- align=center
|Win
|27-2-2
|align=left| Ossie Duran
|
|
|
|align=left|
|align=left|
|- align=center
|Win
|26-2-2
|align=left| Jason LeHoullier
|
|
|
|align=left|
|align=left|
|- align=center
|Win
|25-2-2
|align=left| Dionisio Miranda
|
|
|
|align=left|
|align=left|
|- align=center
|Win
|24-2-2
|align=left| Mariusz Cendrowski
|
|
|
|align=left|
|align=left|
|- align=center
|Loss
|23-2-2
|align=left| Hassan N'Dam N'Jikam
|
|
|
|align=left|
|align=left|
|- align=center
|Win
|23-1-2
|align=left| Sergey Khomitsky
|
|
|
|align=left|
|align=left|
|- align=center
|Win
|22-1-2
|align=left| Mihaly Kotai
|
|
|
|align=left|
|align=left|
|- align=center
|Win
|21-1-2
|align=left| Kuvanych Toygonbayev
|
|
|
|align=left|
|align=left|
|- align=center
|Win
|20-1-2
|align=left| Jamel Bakhi
|
|
|
|align=left|
|align=left|
|- align=center
|Win
|19-1-2
|align=left| Attila Kovacs
|
|
|
|align=left|
|align=left|
|- align=center
|Win
|18-1-2
|align=left| Antonio Valentin Ochoa
|
|
|
|align=left|
|align=left|
|- align=center
|Win
|17-1-2
|align=left| Javier Alberto Mamani
|
|
|
|align=left|
|align=left|
|- align=center
|Win
|16-1-2
|align=left| Ferenc Olah
|
|
|
|align=left|
|align=left|
|- align=center
|Win
|15-1-2
|align=left| Jurijs Boreiko
|
|
|
|align=left|
|align=left|
|- align=center
|Win
|14-1-2
|align=left| Tagir Rzaev
|
|
|
|align=left|
|align=left|
|- align=center
|Win
|13-1-2
|align=left| Volodymyr Borovskyy
|
|
|
|align=left|
|align=left|
|- align=center
|Win
|12-1-2
|align=left| Ruslan Semenov
|
|
|
|align=left|
|align=left|
|- align=center
|Win
|11-1-2
|align=left| Maksym Velychko
|
|
|
|align=left|
|align=left|
|- align=center
|Win
|10-1-2
|align=left| Taras Boyko
|
|
|
|align=left|
|align=left|
|- align=center
|Win
|9-1-2
|align=left| Denis Balandin
|
|
|
|align=left|
|align=left|
|- align=center
|Win
|8-1-2
|align=left| Serhiy Petryk
|
|
|
|align=left|
|align=left|
|- align=center
|Loss
|7-1-2
|align=left| Tony Marshall
|
|
|
|align=left|
|align=left|
|- align=center
|Win
|7-0-2
|align=left| Calvin Shakir
|
|
|
|align=left|
|align=left|
|- align=center
|Win
|6-0-2
|align=left| Chris Hall
|
|
|
|align=left|
|align=left|
|- align=center
|style="background:#abcdef;"|Draw
|5-0-2
|align=left| Carlos Antonio Escobar
|
|
|
|align=left|
|align=left|
|- align=center
|Win
|5-0-1
|align=left| Leo Edwards
|
|
|
|align=left|
|align=left|
|- align=center
|Win
|4-0-1
|align=left| Fred Drayton
|
|
|
|align=left|
|align=left|
|- align=center
|Win
|3-0-1
|align=left| Jon Gaddis
|
|
|
|align=left|
|align=left|
|- align=center
|style="background:#abcdef;"|Draw
|2-0-1
|align=left| Orazio Robinson
|
|
|
|align=left|
|align=left|
|- align=center
|Win
|2-0
|align=left| Kenny Kingsley
|
|
|
|align=left|
|align=left|
|- align=center
|Win
|1-0
|align=left| George Kanchaveli
|
|
|
|align=left|
|align=left|
|- align=center

See also 

 List of IBO world champions

References

External links
 
Avtandil Khurtsidze - Profile, News Archive & Current Rankings at Box.Live

Living people
Middleweight boxers
1979 births
Male boxers from Georgia (country)
Sportspeople from Kutaisi
Sportspeople convicted of crimes
Racketeer Influenced and Corrupt Organizations Act